Perenniporia subacida is a species of poroid fungus in the family Polyporaceae. It is a plant pathogen that infects Douglas firs. The fungus was originally described in 1885 by American mycologist Charles Horton Peck. Marinus Anton Donk transferred it to the genus Perenniporia in 1967. The four varieties of this fungus originally proposed by Peck, namely Polyporus subacidus var. stalactiticus, P. subacidus var. tenuis, P. subacidus var. tuberculosus and P. subacidus var. vesiculosus, have been shown to be synonyms. The species is inedible.

References

Fungi described in 1885
Fungi of North America
Fungal tree pathogens and diseases
Inedible fungi
Perenniporia
Taxa named by Charles Horton Peck